State Road 2 (SR 2) is the designation of two east–west state highways in Florida, each having at least one terminus at that state's border with Georgia.  Both segments lie entirely within 4 miles (6 km) of Florida's northern boundary.

Route description
The western segment of SR 2 extends  from its western terminus (an intersection with SR 81) south of Sweet Gum Head, Florida to the Georgia border near Bascom, Florida. The road continues across the Chattahoochee River and becomes Georgia State Route 91 in Seminole County, Georgia near Donalsonville.  The predominantly rural SR 2 passes through the towns of Pittman, Noma, Campbellton, and Malone as it crosses Holmes and Jackson Counties in the Florida panhandle.

The eastern segment of SR 2 is a  road crossing the Okefenokee Swamp as it connects two separate sections of Georgia State Route 94 between Council, Georgia and Moniac, Georgia. This portion of the highway is extremely deserted and is traveled on very rarely. SR 2 clips the northeastern corner of Columbia County with the segment's westernmost mile. The routing of SR 2 continues as CR 2 at the Florida border in Nassau County just east of St. George, Georgia for about  until its intersection with County Road 121.

Major intersections

County Road 2A

County Road 2A, formerly State Road 2A, exists in two segments.  The first is a short spur that runs into the town of New Harmony in Walton County, and the second runs from the Walton-Holmes County line, through Royals Crossroads and SR 2/SR 81, to CR 185.  The road is signed as County Road 2A.

References

External links

002
002
002
002
002
002
002